Sunshine Daydream is a music documentary film, starring the rock band the Grateful Dead.  It was shot at their August 27, 1972 concert at the Old Renaissance Faire Grounds in Veneta, Oregon. Unreleased for many years, the film was sometimes shown at small film festivals, and bootleg recordings of it circulated on VHS and DVD, and as digital downloads.  A digitally remastered and reedited official version of the film was released on August 1, 2013, showing only one time in selected theaters as that year's edition of the Grateful Dead Meet-Up at the Movies.  It was screened with Grateful Days, a new documentary short that includes interviews with some of the concert attendees.  Sunshine Daydream was released on DVD and Blu-ray on September 17, 2013.

Actor Al Strobel, well known for playing The One-Armed Man in Twin Peaks, shot footage that ended up in the film.

Sunshine Daydream is also a live album containing the complete August 27, 1972 Grateful Dead concert.  Produced as a 3-disc CD and as a 4-disc LP, it was released by Rhino Records on September 17, 2013.

The name Sunshine Daydream is taken from the coda section of the Dead song "Sugar Magnolia".

Concert
The lineup of the Grateful Dead for this concert—and for all their concerts from July 1972 to October 1974—was Jerry Garcia on guitar and vocals, Bob Weir on guitar and vocals, Phil Lesh on bass and vocals, Keith Godchaux on keyboards, Donna Jean Godchaux on vocals, and Bill Kreutzmann on drums.

The show was a benefit for the Springfield Creamery in nearby Springfield, Oregon.  Merry Pranksters Ken Kesey and Ken Babbs emceed the concert. The Dead played all afternoon and into the dark after an opening set by the New Riders of the Purple Sage. In 2004, the New Riders' performance was released as an album called Veneta, Oregon, 8/27/72.

Film

Production
The concert was filmed using four 16 mm cameras, in the woods of the Oregon Coast Range foothills, on the grounds of the Oregon Country Fair. The four 16mm cameras were synced to the sound, and remained focused on the stage, along with two additional roaming cameras for crowd shots. Originally even more cameras had been planned, under an ambitious scheme: "The plot was to develop a signature visual style of representing the band: a camera for each of the 16 channels (at least!) emphasizing the visual kinetics of the music making itself as well as the enormous open communication within the band."

After initial takes were shown to the band, reception was lukewarm and took a backseat to another film project which would become The Grateful Dead Movie. However, the footage for Sunshine Daydream remained sought after by fans and was eventually released after discussions between producer Sam Field and distributor Rhino Entertainment.

Songs in the film
 Excerpts from "Playing in the Band"
"Promised Land"
"China Cat Sunflower"
"I Know You Rider"
"Jack Straw"
"Bird Song"
"Dark Star"
"El Paso"
"Sing Me Back Home"
"Greatest Story Ever Told"

Album

Sunshine Daydream is a live album by the rock band the Grateful Dead.  It contains the complete concert recorded on August 27, 1972 at the Old Renaissance Faire Grounds in Veneta, Oregon.  Produced as a three-disc CD and as a four-disc LP, it was released by Rhino Records on September 17, 2013.  The album was mastered from the 16-track concert soundboard tapes.

The album debuted at #19 on the Billboard 200 on October 5, 2013.  It was the Grateful Dead's second top 20 album, after In the Dark, which reached #6 in 1987.

Critical reception

On AllMusic, Fred Thomas said, "The three sets here have everything that made this one of the most colorful and captivating eras of the Dead's live playing. Somewhere between the caveman psychedelia of their beginnings and the bluegrass-steeped folk-rock of their most popular studio albums American Beauty and Workingman's Dead, Garcia and company refined their live jamming skills into something that seemed almost like a mental synchronization at its best. ... A long-traded fan favorite, Sunshine Daydream finally sees a properly mixed presentation of the 16-track master tapes of nearly three hours of one of the Grateful Dead's finest concert moments. It's essential listening for Deadheads and possibly the best place for the curious to jump in."

Track listing
Disc 1
First set:
Introduction – 4:01
"Promised Land" (Chuck Berry) – 3:24
"Sugaree" (Jerry Garcia, Robert Hunter) – 7:30
"Me and My Uncle" (John Phillips) – 3:16
"Deal" (Garcia, Hunter) – 4:55
"Black-Throated Wind" (Bob Weir, John Perry Barlow)  – 7:01
"China Cat Sunflower" (Garcia, Hunter) – 7:58 →
"I Know You Rider" (traditional, arranged by Grateful Dead) – 7:03
"Mexicali Blues" (Weir, Barlow) – 3:49
"Bertha" (Garcia, Hunter) – 5:59
Disc 2
Second set:
"Playing in the Band" (Weir, Mickey Hart, Hunter) – 19:57
"He's Gone" (Garcia, Hunter) – 9:32
"Jack Straw" (Weir, Hunter) – 5:06
"Bird Song" (Garcia, Hunter) – 13:17
"Greatest Story Ever Told" (Weir, Hart, Hunter) – 5:36
Disc 3
Third set:
"Dark Star" (Garcia, Hart, Bill Kreutzmann, Phil Lesh, Ron "Pigpen" McKernan, Weir, Hunter) – 31:28 →
"El Paso" (Marty Robbins) – 5:04
"Sing Me Back Home" (Merle Haggard) – 10:51
"Sugar Magnolia" (Weir, Hunter) – 8:45
"Casey Jones" (Garcia, Hunter) – 6:25
"One More Saturday Night" (Weir) – 5:03
Notes

Personnel
Grateful Dead
Jerry Garcia – guitar, vocals
Donna Jean Godchaux – vocals
Keith Godchaux – keyboards
Bill Kreutzmann – drums
Phil Lesh – bass, vocals
Bob Weir – guitar, vocals

Production
Produced by Grateful Dead
Produced for release by David Lemieux
Executive producer: Mark Pinkus
Associate producers: Doran Tyson, Ryan Wilson
Mixing, mastering: Jeffrey Norman
Second engineer: Rick Vargas
Recording: Bob Matthews, Betty Cantor-Jackson, Wiz, Janet Furman, Ron Wickersham
Tape transfer, time-base correction, restoration: John K. Chester, Jamie Howarth
Archival research: Nicholas Meriwether
Tape research: Michael Wesley Johnson
Art direction, illustration: Steve Vance
Additional design: Lisa Glines
Tie-dye art: Courtenay Pollock
Special edition liner notes: David Lemieux, Sam Field, Johnny Dwork, Ken Babbs, Nicholas Meriwether

Charts

See also
Al Strobel

References

External links
 

1972 documentary films
1972 films
2013 live albums
2013 soundtrack albums
Films set in Oregon
Films shot in Oregon
Grateful Dead live albums
Grateful Dead soundtracks
Lane County, Oregon
Rhino Entertainment live albums
Rhino Entertainment soundtracks
Rockumentaries
1970s English-language films